The Dalupaon National High School (DNHS) is a government secondary school in Pasacao, Camarines Sur, Philippines. It was founded in February 1972 at Barangay Dalupaon.

The Dolphians, founded in 2002, is the official secondary student publication of the Dalupaon National High School.

References

External links
 Dalupaon National High School Official Web Site
Location of Dalupaon National High School on Google Maps
 American Teacher to teach Dalupaeños

High schools in Camarines Sur
Educational institutions established in 1972
1972 establishments in the Philippines